Constitution Avenue in a street in Canberra, the capital of Australia.

It forms the municipal axis of Walter Burley Griffin's geometric design for the city, and lies on the northern side of Lake Burley Griffin. It is one of the three sides that make up the boundary of the Parliamentary Triangle.

See also

References

Streets in Canberra